Aarabi is a surname. Notable people with the surname include:

Bizhan Aarabi (born 1947), Iranian-American neurosurgeon, researcher, author, and academic
Parham Aarabi (born 1976), Canadian professor and entrepreneur
Sohrab Aarabi (1990–2009), Iranian student and pro-democracy activist

See also 

 Arabi (disambiguation)